Clovis Heimsath, FAIA (born 1930 in New Haven, Connecticut) is an American architect with significant contributions to both architectural scholarship and modern architecture, particularly in Texas. He was educated at Yale, where he was an editorial associate of campus humor magazine The Yale Record.

Noteworthy buildings
Newman Hall at Texas Southern University

Becker Library at St. Stephens Episcopal School

Awards
 Fulbright Scholarship
 Admission to the American Institute of Architects College of Fellows

Publications
 Pioneer Texas Buildings
 Behavioral Architecture
 Geometry in Architecture: Texas Buildings Yesterday and Today

References

1930 births
20th-century American architects
Living people
21st-century American architects
The Yale Record alumni
Yale University alumni